Valli is an Indian Tamil-language soap opera that premiered on Sun TV on 17 December 2012 and ended on 14 September 2019 for 1,961 episodes. The show starred Vidhya Mohan and Rani.

It is the 2nd longest ran 

Tamil soap opera. The show is produced by Saregama and directed by S. Anand Babu.

Plot
Valli portrays the courage shown by a small-town girl who is very simple and ordinary in looks. She runs away from her hometown due to the troubles caused by her maternal uncle as he tries to get Valli married to a local guy for money. Valli starts a fascinating journey seeking fresh hopes in life and an environment to suit herself. She hides her own identity in the new environment and tries settling into a new life without any burdens and sorrows. During this period, there comes a new problem which she had never imaged about.

Over time, enmity develops between Valli and a female rowdy named Indrasena. Indrasena is waiting for Valli to take revenge at the right time. Meanwhile, a lawyer named Nandan falls in love with Valli. Valli also accepts Nandan's desire for marriage. Both are engaged to be married. All have expressed interest in this marriage except Nandan's mother Banumati. Banumati seeks Indrasena's help to prevent the marriage. Subramani's wife Madhumita maintains a fake friendship with Indrasena to help Valli find out about this.

Vikram, also known as Vicky, is introduced there as an employee in the wedding hall. Indrasena tries to confuse Valli's marriage with Vicky. Just as Nandan is getting ready to tie the thaali to Valli at the right moment, Vicky unexpectedly snatches the thaali from Nandan's hand and forcibly ties the thaali around Valli's neck. Valli is upset that she is married to someone she does not know. After that, it is revealed that Vicky is a rich family guy who has the temperament to bet on money and do whatever it takes to win, and thus forcibly tied Thaali around Valli's neck in order to win the bet with Indrasena. Indrasena also comes there and challenges Valli saying that she has given a huge life sentence.

Everyone there, including Nandan, tells Valli about the idea of removing the thaali that was tied against her will and remarrying. However, Valli says that she will never take off the thaali tied around her neck and that she will accept Vicky as her husband and live happily with him, overcoming Indrasena's challenge. Valli accepts Vicky's thaali around her neck and moves to her husband Vicky's house to live with him as his wife. After Valli changes Vicky's mind a little and makes him a responsible man, she starts a husband - wife relationship with him and becomes his wife completely.

She faces many more challenges from the people where she is currently and her life becomes more miserable than ever when she was in her small town. The story then takes a high twist and turn and runs into a peachy mood and how Valli shows her courage to manage all those problems and come out of the situation forms the crux of the story. Valli dons her twin sister Vennila's identity to solve the problems in her life with the help of an old lady named Rajeswari. Vennila's husband Anand didn't go to school at his young days due to his uncle Sivashankaran's evil plans. Shankar also kills Anand's parents and makes Anand as a foolish and scared of his brother Prakash. Valli helps Anand in his learning with the help of her friend Nandan. Vennila is pregnant and the story moves in that line. Shankar's daughter Shalini marries Arun, with an unknown fact that he has a mother and a younger sister. Her uncle Nithish, who loves her makes a plan to separate Shalini and Arun. All these plans go vain due to the idea of Arun's sister in law Anandhi and his father Natarajan.

Shankar and Prakash make accident to Anand with the help of Bala. Due to this accident, Anand reaches Coma stage. Sena gets a new enemy named Inspector Karthikeyan. Karthikeyan and Sena become friends because Sena is helping him to find his kidnapped daughter Vandhana. Sena identifies that Vandhana was kidnapped by Balaji, who wants to avenge his sister who had been raped by Arya, famous businessman Kasinathan's son. Sena rescues her and in the meantime, Bala and Sorna ally again to revenge Valli and Vicky. Anand gets cured of Coma stage and takes charge as MD of Anand Group of Companies. Vennila delivers a baby and gets eyesight. Valli-Vicky goes to Yercaud for honeymoon. But the spirit of Umamaheshwari enters Valli, even though Uma is in coma stage. Now Prakash gets all properties of Anand by kidnapping Vennila's son with the help of his father in law GRK. Prakash marries Devi. Vaishali and GRK find out about Prakash's second marriage. Devi becomes MD of Anand Group of Companies. Prakash becomes her assistant. Indrasena also faces numerous problems through Chamundeshwari, her husband Ashok, Ashok's father Singaperumal and later on through Singaperumal's sister Deivanayaki. Indrasena helps to Judge Sivagami because her granddaughter was murdered by Singaperumal. Anand finds out the truth about Valli. Prakash turns good and plots with Valli and Vicky against Sivashankar. But Sivashankar continues to brainwash Anand. Valli gets pregnant.

Sivashankar implants a bomb in the car in an attempt to kill Vennila. However, Venilla survives and disguises as a male cook by name Singaravelan and joins in Anand's house so that she can expose the true nature of Sivashankar to Anand. Valli's friend Rahul donates his kidney to Azhagamperumal because of kidney failure. But Rahul blackmails Valli and Vicky, he states that the price is Valli's first child. Sivashankar is trying Anand get to marry with a girl Archana although Anand had married. Deivanayaki tries to shoot and kill Indrasena but Sivagami's housemaid Kamala saves Indrasena and Kamala gets shot and dies.then judge sivagami accuses the criminals. Then the life shifts to Valli were the baby of the Valli was adopted to Valli's friend Rahul with the presence of their family. After the critical situation, Rahul gives the baby to Valli and leave their life. The Anand appoints an assistant named Archana

Cast

Main
Uma (1-234) as Valli → Vidhya Mohan (235-1961) as Valli Vikram and Vennila Anand
Rani as Indhrasena a.k.a. Sena, famous don, Valli's friend

Recurring
Raj Kumar Manoharan as Vikram Azhagamperumal a.k.a. Vicky, Azhagamperumal's son, Valli's husband
Ajai Kapoor as Anand Chandrasekharan aka Anand, Chandrasekharan's son, Vennila's husband, Prakash's cousin brother.
Jyothi Lakshmi → Latha as Rajeshwari, Anand and Prakash's grandmother, Chandrasekharan and Sivashankaran's mother
Lakshmi Raj as Prakash, Shivashankaran's son, Anand's cousin brother
Poovilangu Mohan as Azhagamperumal, Vicky and Geetha's father
Kanya Bharathi → Uma Rani as Mythili Azhagamperumal, Azhagamperumal's second wife and Vicky and Geetha's stepmother
S.Kavitha as Geetha Balasundaram, Vicky's sister, Bala's second wife
Rajasekhar → Girish as Sivashankaran, Rajeshwari's second son
Dr. Sharmila as Gayathri Sivashankaran, Sivashankaran's wife
Manoharan Krishnan as Balasundaram, Geetha's and Nagalakshmi's husband, Mythili's brother
Anuradha Krishnamoorthy as Judge Sivagami
Ujjayinee Roy as Chamundeshwari Ashok, Ashok's wife 
Saif as Dileep, Thara's husband
Pooja → Preethi Kumar as Thara Dileep, Indrasena's niece
Bharathi Mohan as Singaperumal, Ashok's father
Nagu Pinky as Deivanayaki, Singaperumal's sister 
Sreenidhi Sudharsan as Nandhini / Lakshmi
V. Dasharathy as Josheyar
Mahalakshmi as Archana, Shivashankaran's assistant
Baby George as Karpagam, Archana's mother
VJ Mounika as Vaishali Prakash, Prakash wife, Valli's friend 
S. Sunil Kumar as G.R.K, Vaishali's father
Nathan Shyam as Rahul, Valli's friend
Sangeetha Gayathri as Ramya Rahul, Rahul's wife
Mohana as TV host 
Ramji as Subramaniam Natraj (Subbu)
Indraja as Madhumitha Subramaniam, Subramani's wife
V.S. Raghavan as Swaminathan, Subramani's grandfather 
Samdani Basha as Mahesh 
Sivan Sreenivasan as Natraj Swaminathan, Subramani's father
Priya as Lakshmi Natraj, Subramani's mother 
Sasi Anand as Kottaiswamy, Valli's uncle
Subramanian Gopalakrishnan as Karthick, Valli's friend 
Dindukal Dhanam → Surekha as Bhagyam, Valli's mother
Bhavani as Santha, Madhumitha's mother
Prakash Rajan as Subash
Dharshini as Poongudi, Valli's mother
Nanjil Nalini as Kottaiswamy's mother 
Sai Sakthi as Kathiravan Natraj, Subramani's brother
Yuvanraj Nethran as Rajesh 
Birla Bose as Singaravelan I.P.S 
Akila as Nirmala, Bala-Nagu's daughter
Haripriya as Shobha, Nandhan's fiancé
Krish as Shobha's elder brother
Geetha as Geetha
Deepa as Sornam, Subramani's aunt 
Sri Vidhya as Deepa, Sornam's daughter
Sadhana as Banumathy, Nandhan's mother
Dev Anand as Nandhan, Valli's ex-fiancé, lawyer
Shamily Sukumar → Sunitha as Shamili Vinod, Vicky's sister
Satish Kumar as Vinod, Shamili's husband
Babitha as Maragatham, Vinod's mother 
Krithika Laddu as Sudha, Madhumitha's friend 
Easter as Subbu's friend
Yamuna as Yamuna 
Jeeva Ravi as Chandrasekharan, Rajeshwari's first son, Anand's father
Niharika as Pavithra, Anand's mother
Vietnam Veedu Sundaram as Sundaram, Indrasena's uncle 
Nagalakshmi as Nagalakshmi Bala (Bala's first wife) 
Pandu as Natarajan, Arun's father 
Sri Vidhya Shankar as Renukadevi, Arun's mother  
Adams as Arun, Shalini's husband
Tejaswini Shekar → Darshana Das as Shalini Arun, Sivashankaran's daughter
Aravind as Aravind, Arun's brother
Sonia as Anandhi, Aravind's wife
Suchithra as Suchithra, Arun's sister
Gopi as Nithish, Shalini's mother 
K. S. Jayalakshmi as Shanthi 
Monika as Vishnu Vandhana 
Guhan Shanmugam as Balaji 
Manikandan as Arya 
Balasubramani as Inspector Karthikeyan
Sangeetha Balan as Sorna, female don
Kasi as Kasinathan
Sudha Prakash as Lakshmi
Bobby Bilani as Aditya, Kasinathan's son
Raja as Mari
Munisraj as Munisraj detective 
Veena Venkatesh as Umamaheshwari's mother
Sowmya Sharada as Umamaheshwari
Rishi as Kishore, Umamaheshwari's lover
Sumangali as Kishore's mother
Nancy Jennifer as Brindha
Mahesh Prabha as Inspector Arumugam
Poorni as Jenny
Archana Harish → Divya Krishnan as Devi
Meena Sellamuthu as Sandi Rani
Prem as Rajaram, Singaperumal's friend
Vasanth Gopinath as Mahendran
Jaheer Hassain as Sathish
Manush as Ashok

Original Soundtrack 
The title song was written by lyricist Dr. Kiruthiya, composed by the music director Paulraj and sung by Saindhavi.

Soundtrack

Awards and Nomination

See also
 List of programs broadcast by Sun TV
 List of longest-running Indian television series

References

External links
 Official website 

Sun TV original programming
Tamil-language television shows
2010s Tamil-language television series
2012 Tamil-language television series debuts
2019 Tamil-language television series endings